Laforce is a municipality in northwestern Quebec, Canada, in the Témiscamingue Regional County Municipality.

Demographics
Population trend:
 Population in 2021: 320 (2016 to 2021 population change: 38.5%)
 Population in 2016: 231 
 Population in 2011: 147 
 Population in 2006: 174
 Population in 2001: 303 (or 299 when adjusted for 2006 boundary)
 Population in 1996: 295
 Population in 1991: 225

Private dwellings occupied by usual residents: 109 (total dwellings: 124)

Mother tongue:
 English as first language: 59.4%
 French as first language: 32.8%
 English and French as first language: 1.6%
 Other as first language: 6.3%

See also
 List of municipalities in Quebec

References

Municipalities in Quebec
Incorporated places in Abitibi-Témiscamingue
Témiscamingue Regional County Municipality